The Abduyi dialect (UniPers: Abduyi) is a Northwestern Iranian language spoken in the village of Abdui, reachable from Kazerun city in Southern Iran, through the old road of Shiraz-Kazerun after 36 kilometers. The number of households of the village has been around 120 in 2004. The dialect is identified as Kurdish by most researchers.

Phonology
The transcription used here is an approximation.

Vowels
short: â, a, e, i, o, u
long: â:, ā, ē, ī, ō, ū

Consonants
voiced dental fricative: ð, a sound near to English voiced "th", generally after vowels, like in 'taðuk' (cockroach).
palatal stops: front 'g' and 'k', like in 'kačče' (chin) and girib (cry).
voiced velar fricative: γ, like in 'jeγarek' (hailstone).
alveolar trill: like in 'borre' (flail).

Grammar

Verbs
Infinitive markers: -san, -tan, -dan.

Nouns
Stresses on different vowels make nouns definite or indefinite. Example:
že (woman), tuhu (house).
Definite: žení (the woman), tevedí (the house).
Indefinite: žéni (a woman), tevédi (a house).

The plural is marked by the suffixes: -gal, -al, -u and -yu. Examples:
sib (apple) → sib-yu (apples)
morb (hen) → morb-u (hens)
âdam (person) → âdam-gal (persons)

Vocabulary

Example sentences

See also
 Dialects of Fars
 Persian dialects and varieties
 Northwestern Iranian languages
 Iranian languages

References

Further reading
Mahamedi, H., 1979. On the verbal system in three Iranian dialects of Fârs, in Studia Iranica, VIII, 2, 277–297.

Fars Province
Languages of Iran
Northwestern Iranian languages
Endangered Iranian languages
Kurdish language